Jon Weisman (born November 26, 1967) is the proprietor of Dodger Thoughts, a weblog devoted to "dealing psychologically with the Los Angeles Dodgers and baseball." He is also a writer and editor for Variety and has contributed to Sports Illustrated's SI.com.

Weisman is the brother of writer and producer Greg Weisman, with whom he has worked as a writer on TV series, such as W.I.T.C.H. and Roughnecks: The Starship Troopers Chronicles. The two brothers co-wrote "The Blackguard Syndrome", an episode of Men in Black: The Series.

Weisman has published two books.  His first book, The Best of Dodger Thoughts, was published in 2005, with longtime Dodger broadcaster Ross Porter writing the foreword.  His second book, 100 Things Dodgers Fans Should Know & Do Before They Die, was published in 2009, with former Dodger owner Peter O'Malley writing the foreword. His third book, Brothers in Arms: Koufax, Kershaw, and the Dodgers Extraordinary Pitching Tradition was released in 2018.

Weisman also edited the Maple Street Press Dodgers Annual 2010, as well as contributing an article to that periodical.

Dodger Thoughts history

Dodger Thoughts began June 21, 2002, with a one sentence post on Blogger. On February 13, 2004, Weisman moved his blog to All-Baseball.com, then on March 9, 2005, the blog moved on to the Baseball Toaster.

On February 2, 2009, Weisman announced that he moved his blog over to the LA Times website. The departure of Weisman to the LA times led to the shutdown of the Baseball Toaster.

About a year after he moved the blog to the Los Angeles Times, Weisman announced he would be moving the blog to ESPN Los Angeles, beginning February 1, 2010.

On June 21, 2022, Dodger Thoughts celebrated its 20th anniversary.

References

External links
 Weisman's "A kind of biography"
 Weisman's SI.com archive
 Weisman's Variety archive

American bloggers
Living people
1967 births